The West Coast lady (Vanessa annabella) is one of three North American species of brush-footed butterflies known colloquially as the "painted ladies". V. annabella occurs throughout much of the western US and southwestern Canada. The other two species are the cosmopolitan Vanessa cardui (painted lady) and the eastern Vanessa virginiensis (American painted lady). This species has also been considered a subspecies of the South American Vanessa carye and is frequently misspelled as "anabella".

Distinguishing features

Aside from general differences in distribution, V. annabella can be distinguished from the other two painted ladies of North America as follows:

Most conspicuously, it lacks obvious ventral eyespots on the hindwings; there are two large ones on V. virginiensis and four small ones on V. cardui. Like the latter, it also lacks a white dot in the pinkish-orange subapical field of the ventral and dorsal forewings. Its upperwing coloration has the purest orange of the three; the American painted lady is usually quite reddish.

A less reliable indicator is the row of black eyespots on the dorsal submarginal hindwing. These are usually of roughly equal size in V. cardui and lack blue centers, though the summer morph may have a few tiny ones. In the other two, usually two eyespots are larger and have more conspicuous blue centers. In V. virginiensis, these normally are the spot at each end of the row, whereas in the present species it is the two middle ones.

See also
Cynthia (butterfly)
Vanessa carye

References
West Coast Lady, Butterflies of Canada

External links

Vanessa (butterfly)
Butterflies of North America
Butterflies described in 1971
Fauna of the Western United States